The Nathalia Football Netball Club, nicknamed the Purples, is an Australian rules football and netball club based in the town of Nathalia located in north east Victoria. The club 
currently compete in the Murray League, which Nathalia joined in 1931.

Club history

The club was established in 1888 and played in a number of different football associations in its early years, winning a number of premierships along the way.

The club managed to win five Goulburn Valley Football Association premierships between 1896 and 1930.

At a Murray Football League (MFL) club's delegates meeting in June, 1940, MFL club's decided to abandoned the season and a motion was carried to conclude the season at the end of the first round. Nathalia Football Club were undefeated when the season was officially abandoned in 1940 "and will retain the pennant until the end of next season's play".

Between 1941 and 1945 the MFL went into recess for World War II.

Former Essendon and Glenelg ruckman, Norm Betson was appointed as captain / coach in 1950.

Nathalia won four in a row from 2005 to 2008 and five in a row from 2015 to 2019. Nathalia now boast the equal most (14) premierships in the Murray Football league alongside the Deniliquin Rams with 10 premierships coming from the last 15 seasons.

Football Competitions Timeline
Goulburn Valley Football Association
 1888 & 1889
Nathalia Football Club
1890 & 1891 – Unsure, in recess ?
Goulburn Valley Football Association
1892 to 1897
Nathalia & District Football Association
1898 & 1899
Goulburn Valley Football Association
1900
Barmah & Lower Moria Football Association 
1901 to 1903
Nathalia & District Football Association
1904
Picola & District Football Association
1905
Goulburn Valley Football Association
1906
Picola & District Football Association
1907
Western & Moria Ridings Football Association
1908 to 1915
Nathalia Football Club
1916 to 1918 – Club in recess due to World War I.
Western & Moria Ridings Football Association
1919 to 1920
Goulburn Valley Football Association
1921 to 1930
Western & Moria Ridings Football Association
1931 to 1932
Murray Football League
1933 to 1940
Nathalia Football Club
1941 to 1945 – Club in recess due to World War II.
Murray Football League
1946 to present day

Football Premierships
Seniors
 Goulburn Valley Football Association (5):
 1896, 1897, 1923, 1927, 1930
 Barmah Central Football Association (1):
 1901
 Nathalia District Football Association (1):
 1904
 Western & Moira Ridings Football Association (1):
 1932
 Picola & District Football League
 1947 (NFC 2nds) 
 Murray Football League (14):
 1939, 1949, 1963, 1978, 2005, 2006, 2007, 2008, 2012, 2015, 2016, 2017, 2018, 2019

Reserves
Murray Football League
 1997, 2000

O'Dwyer Medallists (League Best & Fairest) 

 1976 – P. Pettigrew (15 votes)
 1983 – Wayne Deledio (28 votes)
 1985 – B. Morrison (26 votes)
 2004 – Ashley Gemmill (25 votes)
 2005 – Nathan Gemmill (19 votes) Joint winner

Les Mogg Perpetual Trophy Winners (Murray FL – Leading Goalkicker) 

 1950 – Denis Bourke (70 goals)
 1962 – M. McKay (64 goals)
 1987 – Michael Souter (125 goals)
 1988 – Michael Souter (117 goals)
 2000 – Adam Rudd (78 goals)
 2004 – Brendon Parker (92 goals)
 2005 – Brendon Parker (120 goals)
 2006 – Brendon Parker (108 goals)
 2007 – Brendon Parker (106 goals)
 2012 – Jason Limbrick (76 goals)
 2018 – Brodie Ross (59 goals)

Rising Star Award Winners 

 2004 – Drew Barnes
 2014 – Tom Nihill
 2017 – Bailey Bell
 2018 – Adam Jorgensen

Nathalia FC / VFL / AFL senior football players 
The year indicates their VFL / AFL debut match.

Victorian Football League
1912 – Keith Doig – University
1921 – George Robinson – Richmond
1925 – John Sutherland – Footscray
1930 – Hope Collins – Richmond
1932 – Matt Carland – Essendon & Footscray
1936 – Alan Crawford – North Melbourne
1941 – Jimmy Bates – Essendon
1943 – Frank Bourke (1943, 1946–1947) Richmond – 16 games
1965 – Wes Smith – Hawthorn
1967 – Francis Bourke (1967–1981) Richmond – 300 games played & 46 games as coach of Richmond.

Australian Football League – National Draft
1989 – Brett Hawkey (1989 VFL Draft – # 20) North Melbourne – 0 games
1991 – Brendon Parker (1991 AFL Mid-Season Draft – #7) Carlton – 5 games

References

External links
 
 Gameday website

Murray Football League clubs
1887 establishments in Australia
Sports clubs established in 1887
Australian rules football clubs established in 1887
Netball teams in Victoria (Australia)
Australian rules football clubs in Victoria (Australia)